The Midnight Watch is a 1927 American silent crime film directed by Charles J. Hunt and starring Roy Stewart, Mary McAllister and David Torrence.

Cast
 Roy Stewart as Bob Breemer 
 Mary McAllister as Rose Denton 
 David Torrence as Chief Callahan 
 Ernest Hilliard
 Marcella Daly

References

Bibliography
 Ken Wlaschin. Silent Mystery and Detective Movies: A Comprehensive Filmography. McFarland, 2009.

External links

1927 films
1927 crime films
American crime films
Films directed by Charles J. Hunt
American silent feature films
Rayart Pictures films
American black-and-white films
1920s English-language films
1920s American films